Oscar Deutsch (12 August 1893 – 5 December 1941) was a British businessman. He was the founder of Odeon Cinemas in 1928, with the flagship cinema, the Odeon, Leicester Square in London, opening in 1937.

Life and career
Deutsch was born in Balsall Heath, Birmingham, Warwickshire, the son of Leopold Deutsch, a successful Hungarian Jewish scrap metal merchant. After attending King Edward VI Five Ways Grammar School, he started work at his father's metal firm in Birmingham. In 1918, he married and went on to have three sons. In 1925, he rented cinemas in Wolverhampton and Coventry and started exhibiting subsequent runs of films. He opened his first cinema in nearby Brierley Hill, Dudley in 1928. By 1933 he had 26 Odeons and "Odeon" had started to become a household word, used interchangeably with "cinema" in some parts of the UK until after the Second World War.

By 1937 there were 250 Odeons, including the flagship cinema in Leicester Square, London, making Odeon one of the three major circuits in the UK. Odeon cinemas were considered more comfortable and respectable for middle-class filmgoers than those of the two other circuits, Associated British Cinemas (ABC) and Gaumont-British Cinemas. Odeons were known for their art deco architecture, first used on the Odeon, Kingstanding to a design by Cecil Clavering, working for Harry Weedon. Although Clavering only designed three further Odeons, at Sutton Coldfield, Colwyn Bay and Scarborough, "one masterpiece after the other" considered "the finest expressions of the Odeon circuit style". Later in 1935, however, Clavering stunned Weedon by resigning to take up a job with the Office of Works. Weedon approached Clavering's former tutor who recommended Robert Bullivant as Clavering's replacement and Weedon was commissioned by Deutsch to oversee the design of the entire chain.

Deutsch became a director of the UK arm of United Artists, who had acquired a 50% stake in Odeon Cinema Holdings.

He was from 1932 to 1940 President of Birmingham's main Synagogue, Singers Hill. In 1939, the Synagogue was extended by Harry Weedon.

In 1941, a bomb landed on his home and he was blown out of bed and never recovered. After Deutsch died of cancer in 1941, his widow sold the Odeon chain to J. Arthur Rank and it became part of the Rank Organisation, who also bought, but managed separately, Gaumont-British Cinemas.

Origin of "Odeon"
The original Odeons were the popular amphitheatres of ancient Greece. The name Odeon had been appropriated by cinemas in France and Italy in the 1920s, but Deutsch made it his own in the UK. His publicity team claimed Odeon stood for "Oscar Deutsch Entertains Our Nation".

See also
 Arnold Deutsch - cousin and spy for the Russians who hired the Cambridge Five spy ring
 George Coles (architect)

References

Further reading
 Eyles, Allen Odeon Cinemas - Oscar Deutsch Entertains Our Nation. London: British Film Institute 2001

External links
BFI Screenonline on Oscar Deutsch

1893 births
1941 deaths
English Jews
English people of Hungarian-Jewish descent
Businesspeople from Birmingham, West Midlands
Deaths from cancer in England
People educated at King Edward VI Five Ways
Film exhibitors
20th-century English businesspeople